Samina Humayun Saeed is a Pakistani producer and wife of actor Humayun Saeed. She is best known for producing drama serials such as Kuch Pyar Ka Pagalpan, Kaash Main Teri Beti Na Hoti, Akbari Asghari, Sadqay Tumhare, Mann Mayal and Alif under her banner Next Level Entertainment. She won the Hum Award for Best Drama Serial Popular award at 3rd Hum Awards for producing Sadqay Tumhare.

Filmography

 Kuch Pyar Ka Pagalpan
 Kaash Main Teri Beti Na Hoti
 Maseeha
 Daddy
 Mehmoodabad Ki Malkain
 Akbari Asghari
 Sadqay Tumhare
 Khuda Mera Bhi Hai
 Mann Mayal
Khudgarz
Do Bol
 Bikhray Moti
 Faryad
 Amanat
 Sinf-e-Aahan

Awards
 Hum Award for Best Drama Serial - Sadqay Tumhare - nom
 Hum Award for Best Drama Serial Popular - Sadqay Tumhare - won

References

External links 
 Samina Humayun Saeed at Vidpk.com
 

Living people
Pakistani television producers
Pakistani film producers
Year of birth missing (living people)